The 1905 All-Ireland Senior Hurling Championship Final was the 18th All-Ireland Final and the culmination of the 1905 All-Ireland Senior Hurling Championship, an inter-county hurling tournament for the top teams in Ireland. The match was held on 14 April 1907 between Cork and Kilkenny. Cork won the first game, but after an objection was raised about Cork keeper Daniel McCarthy being a reservist for the British Army, a replay was ordered, won by Kilkenny.

Match details

References
 Corry, Eoghan, The GAA Book of Lists (Hodder Headline Ireland, 2005).
 Donegan, Des, The Complete Handbook of Gaelic Games (DBA Publications Limited, 2005).

1
All-Ireland Senior Hurling Championship Finals
Cork county hurling team matches
Kilkenny GAA matches